Cabezas Airport  is an airstrip serving the small town of Cabezas in the Santa Cruz Department of Bolivia.

Cabezas is just east of the Cordillera Central mountains, and the runway is south of the town, next to the Grande River.

See also

Transport in Bolivia
List of airports in Bolivia

References

External links 
OpenStreetMap - Cabezas
OurAirports - Cabezas
Fallingrain - Cabezas Airport
Bing Maps - Cabezas

Airports in Santa Cruz Department (Bolivia)